Tony Morrison (born ) is an English former professional rugby league footballer who played in the 1980s and 1990s. He played at club level for Oldham (Heritage No.), Swinton, and Castleford (Heritage No. 698).

Background
Tony Morrison was born in Oldham, Lancashire, England.

Playing career

Regal Trophy Final appearances
Tony Morrison played left- in Castleford's 33–2 victory over Wigan in the 1993–94 Regal Trophy Final during the 1993–94 season at Headingley, Leeds on Saturday 22 January 1994.

Club career
Tony Morrison was transferred from Swinton to Castleford on 27 May 1992.

References

External links
Tony Morrison Memory Box Search at archive.castigersheritage.com

1965 births
Living people
Castleford Tigers players
English rugby league players
Oldham R.L.F.C. players
Rugby league second-rows
Rugby league players from Oldham
Swinton Lions players